Kasper Ryan Irming Andersen (born March 12, 1986 in Aarhus) is a Danish handball player who plays in KIF Kolding. He has played several matches for the Danish national team.

Previously Irming has played for Skanderborg Håndbold, Voel KFUM, Ikast-Brande EH and Aarhus GF Håndbold.

References 
 Irming og Lauge i landsholdstrup 
 The national team squad 
 Irming udtaget til Wilbecks trup 

Danish male handball players
1986 births
Living people
Place of birth missing (living people)
Sportspeople from Aarhus
KIF Kolding players